Abaza Siyavuş Pasha I (died 25 April 1656) was an Ottoman grand vizier (the index I is used to differentiate him from the second and better known Abaza Siyavuş Pasha, who also served as grand vizier, from 1687 to 1688). He was married with Safiye Hanımsultan, daughter of the princess Gevherhan Sultan and granddaughter of Sultan Ahmed I and his Haseki Kösem Sultan. 

He was of Abazin origin and a manservant of Abaza Mehmed, who was a rebel leader of the Ottoman Empire in the 17th century. Upon the execution of his master, he entered the service of the palace in Istanbul. In 1638, he was promoted to be a vizier, and in 1640, he was assigned as the Kapudan Pasha (Admiral of the Navy). In 1642, he was tasked with recapturing the fort of Azov (in modern Russia) from the Cossacks, but failed. He was then assigned to various cities as governor, including Erzurum, Diyarbakır (both in modern Turkey) and Silistra (in modern Bulgaria). On 5 March 1651, he was promoted to be the grand vizier following an uprising of tradesmen in Istanbul. On 27 September, a little more than a month after his appointment, he was dismissed from his post and was about to be executed when the Valide Sultan Kösem intervened to save his life. He was appointed as the governor of Bosnia. Although Abaza Siyavuş Pasha was again promoted to the post of grand vizier on 5 March 1656, he died soon afterwards on 25 April.

See also
 List of Ottoman Grand Viziers
 List of Ottoman governors of Bosnia

References

Abazins
Year of birth unknown
1656 deaths
17th-century Grand Viziers of the Ottoman Empire
Pashas
People from the Ottoman Empire of Abkhazian descent
Ottoman governors of Bosnia